KPUR (1440 AM), branded as "Sportsradio 1440", is a radio station serving the Amarillo, Texas, area with a sports format. This station is under ownership of Cumulus Media.  Its studios are located at the Amarillo Building downtown on Polk Street, and its transmitter tower is based southeast of Amarillo in unincorporated Randall County along Loop 335 (Hollywood Road).

KPUR was once KFDA on 1230 kHz. It hit the air in 1939. After World War II, Amarillo station KGNC moved from 1440 kHz to 710 kHz with greater power. KFDA filed to move to the vacated 1440 raising power from 250 watts on 1230 to 5,000 watts days and 1,000 watts nights. Night used a three tower directional antenna system. The call letters changed to KPUR in 1966. The station was sold by former television partner KFDA-TV (and Texas State Network interests) to Charlie Jordan, the manager at the time.

The towers were located east of Amarillo just south of the former Route 66 (now I-40) which shared land with the studios. In the mid seventies the land was largely sold off to shopping center developers. Towers were relocated to the present site. That site was subject to a late 1970s fire when a Harris MW-5 transmitter melted down. The MW-5 used a step up transformer to raise the three phase input power (at 240 volts) to 17,000 volts. The primary wiring had been bundled closely to the secondary wiring and tightly lashed together. When an insulation breakdown allowed the input wiring to arc, the high temperatures allowed the secondary wires to short to the inputs. This caused extremely high circulating currents and a meltdown of the transformer frame (made of metal castings and laminations).

The station is an affiliate of the Dallas Cowboys radio network and the West Texas Friday Night Scoreboard Show.

On March 30, 2012 KPUR changed their format from sports to oldies, branded as "True Oldies".

On October 22, 2012 KPUR changed their format back to sports, branded as "ESPN 1440" with programming from ESPN Radio.

On January 2, 2013 KPUR switched affiliations from ESPN Radio to CBS Sports Radio, branded as "Sportsradio 1440".

References

External links

PUR
Sports radio stations in the United States
CBS Sports Radio stations
Cumulus Media radio stations